Hala Hameed (born 6 November 1963) is a Maldivian politician and diplomat who has been Secretary, Multilateral at the Ministry of Foreign Affairs since August 2020.

The daughter of Abdulla Hameed, she was educated at the American University of Beirut, the University of the South Pacific (BA, 1989), and the University of East Anglia (MPhil, 1993; PhD, 2004). Her PhD was entitled "Understanding gender and intra-household relations: a case study of Shaviyani Atoll, Maldives". She served as Minister of State for Health and Gender from December 2013 to July 2014, and Minister of State for Law and Gender from July 2014 to August 2015. She was Maldivian representative to the United Nations Office at Geneva from January 2016 to July 2020.

She is a niece of Abdulla Yameen and Maumoon Abdul Gayoom.

References

1963 births
Living people
American University of Beirut alumni
University of the South Pacific alumni
Alumni of the University of East Anglia
Women government ministers of the Maldives
21st-century Maldivian women politicians
21st-century Maldivian politicians
21st-century diplomats
Maldivian women diplomats
Women ambassadors
Ambassadors of the Maldives
20th-century Maldivian women